Ethical monotheism is a form of exclusive monotheism in which God is believed to be the only god as well as the source for one's standards of morality, guiding humanity through ethical principles.

Definition
Ethical monotheism originated within Judaism. It is present in various other monotheistic religions, such as Zoroastrianism, Christianity, the Baháʼí Faith, Sikhism, and Islam. All of these monotheistic religions include the belief in one Supreme Being as the ultimate authority and creator of the universe. In Christianity, God is worshipped as the Trinity or according to Nontrinitarian conceptions of God. In monotheistic religions, other deities are variously considered to be false or demonic, and it is believed that any other gods cannot be compared to the one that they respectively regard as the only true God.

See also

 Argument from morality
 Atenism
 Baháʼí Faith and the unity of religion
 Baháʼí moral teachings
 Christian ethics
 Comparative religion
 Demiurge
 Dhimmi
 Dystheism
 Evil God challenge
 God in Abrahamic religions
 God in the Baháʼí Faith
 God in Christianity
 God in Judaism
 God in Islam
 God in Sikhism
 God in Zoroastrianism
 Jewish ethics
 Judeo-Christian ethics
 Maltheism
 Moralistic therapeutic deism
 Morality in Islam
 Natural religion
 Outline of theology
 Problem of evil
 Problem of Hell
 Seven Laws of Noah
 Ger toshav (resident alien)
 Noahidism
 Theodicy
 Urmonotheismus (primitive monotheism)
 Violence in the Bible
 Violence in the Quran

References

Bibliography

Monotheism
Religious ethics